German submarine U-871 was a long-range Type IXD2 U-boat built for Nazi Germany's Kriegsmarine during World War II.

She was ordered on 25 August 1941, and was laid down on 14 November 1942 at DeSchiMAG AG Weser, Bremen, as yard number 1079. She was launched on 7 September 1943 and commissioned under the command of Kapitänleutnant Erwin Ganzer on 15 January 1944.

Design
German Type IXD2 submarines were considerably larger than the original Type IXs. U-871 had a displacement of  when at the surface and  while submerged. She had two shafts and two  propellers.

U-871 was fitted with six  torpedo tubes (four fitted at the bow and two at the stern), 24 torpedoes, one  SK C/32 naval gun, 150 rounds, and a  Flak M42 with 2575 rounds as well as two  C/30 anti-aircraft guns with 8100 rounds. The boat had a complement of fifty-five.

Service history
On 26 September 1944, U-871 was sunk by depth charges northwest of the Azores, by a British B-17 Flying Fortress of 220 Squadron/P RAF. All 69 of her crew were lost.

References

Bibliography

External links

World War II submarines of Germany
German Type IX submarines
Ships built in Bremen (state)
1943 ships
U-boats commissioned in 1944
U-boats sunk in 1944
World War II shipwrecks in the Atlantic Ocean
Maritime incidents in September 1944
Ships lost with all hands